Cryptantha crassisepala (common name thicksepal catseye) is a plant found in the southwestern United States.

Uses
Among the Zuni people, a hot infusion of the pulverized plant is applied to limbs for fatigue.

References

crassisepala
Flora of the Southwestern United States
Plants used in traditional Native American medicine
Plants described in 1887